Główszczyzna in Polish tradition was a name for a fine, paid by a killer or his family to the family of his/her victim. The name is derived from głowa, meaning head.

See also
Blood money
Diyya
Ericfine 
Galanas
Weregild

Polish culture
Crime in Poland
Compensation for victims of crime

pl:Główszczyzna